Grand station may refer to:

Grand station (CTA Blue Line), a Chicago 'L' station
Grand station (CTA North Side Main Line), a former Chicago Transit Authority station
Grand station (CTA Red Line), a Chicago 'L' station
Grand Boulevard station, a QLINE station in Detroit, Michigan
Grand (St. Louis MetroLink), in St. Louis, Missouri
Grand/LATTC station, formerly Grand station, a Los Angeles Metro Rail station

See also
Grand (disambiguation)
Grand Central Station (disambiguation)
Gran Station, a railroad station in Gran, Norway